Doorbin is a Bangladeshi rock band formed in 2004.

History
In 2004 Syed Shahid formed the band Doorbin with Sabbir and Noyon. In 2006 they released their first album "Doorbin" with help of a number of well wisher.

Members
Current members:
 Syed Shahid (Band Leader & Main Vocal)
 Ayub Shahrier (Vocal & Rhythm)
 Fahad (Lead Guiter)
 Rafi (Keyboard & Composer)
 Shishir (Drums)
 Hridoy (Lead Guiter)
 Shawn (Base Guiter)

Past members:
 Arfin Rumey (Vocal & Composer)
 Kazi Shuvo (Vocal & Guiter)

Album and singles

Solo albums
 Doorbin (2006)
 Doorbin 2.01 (2008)
 Doorbin 3.01 (2010)
 Doorbin 4.01 (2015)
 Doorbin 5.01 (2017)

Mixed albums
 Amader-71 (2015)
 Amader-71 2.0 (2016)

Awards
 5th Citycel-Channel I Awards (Best Band) - Won

References

External links
 Doorbin on Twitter
 Doorbin on Facebook

Bangladeshi rock music groups
Bangladeshi folk music groups
Bangladeshi pop music groups